Smast is a village on the left bank of the Soča River in the Municipality of Kobarid in the Littoral region of Slovenia.

References

External links

Smast on Geopedia

Populated places in the Municipality of Kobarid